Susan Wijeratna is a schoolteacher, the first woman to become Lower Master at Eton College.

Biography 

Susan Cook was born in May 1969. She is the daughter of a schoolteacher, the head of Epsom College. She was educated at Brighton College. She took her bachelor's degree in geography at the University of Birmingham.

Wijeratna's first teaching job was at Epsom College. She moved to Eastbourne College and then became head of geography at St Benedict's School, Ealing. She served as the deputy head of St Paul's Girls' School, responsible for pastoral affairs.

She became the first woman to become Lower Master (deputy head) at Eton College on her appointment there in September 2017. Bedales School praised Eton for the appointment.

In 2019 she became a director of the Royal Ballet School. While at Eton, she served for a while as governor of St Stephen's Church of England Primary School.
In 2023 she becomes head of Latymer Upper School.

Personal life 

She is married to the environmental activist Alex Wijeratna. They have two daughters.

References 

1969 births
Alumni of the University of Birmingham
People educated at Brighton College
Living people